Biddell is a surname. Notable people with the surname include:

 George Biddell Airy (1801–1892), English mathematician and astronomer
 Kerrie Biddell (1947–2014), Australian jazz singer, pianist, and vocal teacher
 William Biddell (1825–1900), English politician

See also
 Bidwell (surname)